Atteva albiguttata is a moth of the  family Attevidae. It is found in Australia.

The larvae cause significant damage to an as yet undescribed and rare Quassia species (family Simaroubaceae).

References

External links
Australian Faunal Directory
CSIRO Entomology
Insect damage to fruit of endangered Lilly Pillies (Syzgium sp.) and an endangered Quassia species

Attevidae
Moths described in 1873